La Grande Encyclopédie, inventaire raisonné des sciences, des lettres, et des arts (The Great Encyclopedia: a systematic inventory of science, letters, and the arts) is a 31-volume encyclopedia published in France from 1886 to 1902 by H. Lamirault, and later by the Société Anonyme de la Grande Encyclopédie (Grande Encyclopédie Company).

The general secretaries of its editorial board were Ferdinand-Camille Dreyfus and André Berthelot.

Major articles are signed and include a bibliography. In its 31 volumes of 1200 pages each, there are about 200,000 articles, 15,000 engraved illustrations and 200 maps.

From the Preface:

In the article "Encyclopédie":

According to the Library of Congress catalog record, the individual volumes were published in the following years: 1-2: 1886, 3-4: 1887, 4: 1887, 5-6: 1888, 7-8: 1889, 8: 1889, 9-11: 1890, 12-13: 1891, 14-16: 1892, 17-18: 1893, 19-20: 1894, 21: 1895, 22: 1896, 23: 1898, 24-26: 1899, 27-8: 1900, 29-30: 1901, 31: 1902.

External links
A scan of the full text is available at Gallica: .  The article title ranges are given in the volume titles; there is no direct way to go to a particular article.
  

French encyclopedias
1886 non-fiction books
20th-century encyclopedias
19th-century encyclopedias